The DXN Bridge over the Little Missouri River is one of a group of thirty-one bridges in Wyoming that were collectively listed on the National Register of Historic Places as excellent examples of steel truss bridges of the early 20th century. The DXN Bridge is located in Crook County, Wyoming. It was built about 1920. The bridge is unique in lacking inclined end posts.

The Wyoming bridges were listed on the National Register of Historic Places in 1985.

References

External links
Bridge over the Missouri River at the Wyoming State Historic Preservation Office
Missouri River Bridge, Spanning Missouri River on County Road 200, Hulett vicinity, Crook, WY at the Historic American Engineering Record (HAER)

Road bridges on the National Register of Historic Places in Wyoming
Transportation in Crook County, Wyoming
Bridges completed in 1920
Buildings and structures in Crook County, Wyoming
Historic American Engineering Record in Wyoming
National Register of Historic Places in Crook County, Wyoming
Steel bridges in the United States
Pratt truss bridges in the United States
Little Missouri River (North Dakota)